Montauban Football Club Tarn-et-Garonne is a football club based in Montauban, France. As of the 2021–22 season, it competes in the Régional 2, the seventh tier of French football. The club's colours are yellow and blue.

History 
Founded in 1953, the club was formerly known as Montauban FC until 2004. The furthest round they have reached in the Coupe de France is the round of 64, which they have done on four occasions. Montauban notably played nine seasons in the Division 3 in the 1970s and 80s.

Honours

References

External links 
 Club website

Montauban FCTG
1953 establishments in France
Association football clubs established in 1953
Sport in Tarn-et-Garonne
Football clubs in Occitania (administrative region)